This is the order of battle for the Battle of Bussaco, 27 September 1810.

French Army of Portugal 
Commander-in-Chief: Marshal Masséna

Army total: 65,050 (49,809 infantry, 8,419 cavalry, 144 guns)

II Corps 

GD Jean Reynier

VI Corps 

Marshal Michel Ney

VIII Corps 

GD Jean-Andoche Junot

Reserves

Anglo-Portuguese Army 
Commander-in-Chief: Lt Gen Viscount Wellington

Army total: 51,768 (49,328 infantry, 210 cavalry, 60 guns)

References

Notes

Peninsular War orders of battle